Emerson da Conceição (born 23 February 1986), known as Emerson, is a Brazilian professional footballer who plays as a left back.

Club career

Lille
In January 2007, aged only 20, São Paulo-born Emerson left his country and moved to Lille OSC in France. He appeared in only two Ligue 1 games in his first season, his debut coming on 8 April in a 1–4 away loss against Olympique de Marseille.

Emerson became first-choice from the 2008–09 campaign onwards, and contributed with 20 league matches in 2010–11 as Les Dogues won their first national championship in 57 years. He also helped the team win the Coupe de France, but remained on the bench during the final against Paris Saint-Germain FC.

Benfica
In late July 2011, Emerson signed for Portuguese club S.L. Benfica, for an undisclosed fee. In his first and only season, he beat competition from World and European champion Joan Capdevila.

Trabzonspor
On 3 September 2012, Emerson joined Trabzonspor in Turkey for €1.6 million. One year later he signed for Stade Rennais F.C. in the French top flight, returning to his homeland in 2014 with Clube Atlético Mineiro.

Club statistics

Honours
Lille
Ligue 1: 2010–11
Coupe de France: 2010–11

Benfica
Taça da Liga: 2011–12

Atlético Mineiro
Recopa Sudamericana: 2014
Copa do Brasil: 2014
Campeonato Mineiro: 2015

References

External links

1986 births
Living people
Footballers from São Paulo
Brazilian footballers
Association football defenders
Campeonato Brasileiro Série A players
J. Malucelli Futebol players
Clube Atlético Mineiro players
Coritiba Foot Ball Club players
Ligue 1 players
Lille OSC players
Stade Rennais F.C. players
Primeira Liga players
S.L. Benfica footballers
Süper Lig players
Trabzonspor footballers
Brazilian expatriate footballers
Expatriate footballers in France
Expatriate footballers in Portugal
Expatriate footballers in Turkey
Brazilian expatriate sportspeople in France
Brazilian expatriate sportspeople in Portugal